Lions Hill is a 42.9 hectare biological Site of Special Scientific Interest in Dorset, notified in 1985.

External links
 English Nature website (SSSI information)

Sites of Special Scientific Interest in Dorset
Sites of Special Scientific Interest notified in 1985